Thornhagh is a surname. Notable people with the surname include:

 Francis Thornhagh (1617–1648), English soldier and MP
 Thomas Thornhagh (fl. 1393), English politician